The Big Central Soccer Conference was a Division I soccer conference in the NCAA. It was originally known as the Big Central Six Soccer Conference. The founding members were Southern Illinois University Edwardsville (SIU Edwardsville or SIUE), Quincy College (now Quincy University), Marquette University, Northern Illinois University, and the University of Wisconsin-Milwaukee (now athletically branded as "Milwaukee"), with the University of Cincinnati joining in 1988. 

Three of the founding members—Quincy, SIU Edwardsville, and Wisconsin–Milwaukee—were Division II schools that played Division I men's soccer (Milwaukee moved to Division I for all sports in 1990, and SIUE did the same in 2008). The conference existed from 1987 through 1990 with nine member schools in its short history. In 1991, the primary conferences of all but the two remaining Division II schools, SIU Edwardsville and Quincy, sponsored competition in men's soccer. Since only the two Division II schools had a need for the Big Central, the conference ceased to exist, and those two, Quincy and SIUE, joined the division II Great Lakes Valley Conference in all sports following a brief period as independents and two seasons in the Mid-Continent Conference.

Members
Cincinnati Bearcats (1988–90)
Drake Bulldogs (1988–1990)
Louisville Cardinals (1989–90)
Marquette Warriors (1987–88)
Northern Illinois Huskies (1987–89)
 Quincy Hawks (1987–90)
SIU Edwardsville Cougars (1987–90)
Wisconsin–Milwaukee Panthers (1987–1990)
Wright State Raiders (1990)

Standings
Sources:

Regular season champions
(From above)
1987 Quincy & SIUE
1988 Quincy
1989 UW-Milwaukee* & Cincinnati 
1990 UW-Milwaukee
 * = Top seed on tiebreaker.

Tournament champions
1987 No tourney
1988 Quincy
1989 Northern Illinois (Beat UW-M on PKs)
1990 Wisconsin-Milwaukee

References

Defunct NCAA Division I conferences
Sports leagues established in 1987
1990 disestablishments in the United States
1987 establishments in the United States
Sports leagues disestablished in 1990